A pet shop or pet store is a retail business which sells animals and pet care resources to the public. A variety of animal supplies and pet accessories are also sold in pet shops. The products sold include: food, treats, toys, collars, leashes, cat litter, cages and aquariums. Some pet stores provide engraving services for pet tags, which have the owner's contact information in case the pet gets lost.

In the United Kingdom, United States and Canada, pet shops often offer both hygienic care (such as pet cleaning) and aesthetic services (such as cat and dog grooming). Some pet stores also provide tips on training and behaviour, as well as advice on pet nutrition.

Pet stores are extremely popular in modern society. In 2004, according to the American Pet Products Manufacturers Association, in the pet industry, live animal sales reached approximately $1.6 billion. Moreover, in a 2003 survey in the US, merely 38% of U.S. pet shops claimed that they did not sell any live animals.

Online pet stores
Many pet stores also offer retail products online. Citing convenience as the key motivational factor for purchasing from online pet stores, the number of United States households that shopped online for pet care products in 2018 was 13 million. Other stated advantages for online shopping include competitive pricing and good value due to free shipping offers. As of 2017, North America has the largest online pet care market of any other region. In the United States, more than 1/3 of all purchases from online pet stores were made at PetSmart with the most popular item purchased being dry dog food. In 2017, the online sales of pet care products grew by about 3.4 billion dollars, while traditional brick-and-mortar stores reported only about 317 million dollars in sales growth. 

As of 2018, Millennials are the biggest pet-owning generation. Seventy-seven percent report that they prefer to purchase pet products like toys, accessories, and food online, but favor in-store shopping for treats, bedding and clothing.

In the United States pet sales make up only 6% of the market, with most sales comprising accessories and merchandise.

Countries

Germany 
The largest pet store in the world is located in Duisburg, Germany. Zoo Zajac is located in a 130,000 square-foot warehouse and houses more than 250,000 animals from 3,000 different species. The store has become a tourist attraction, with visitors interacting with it like a zoo.

United States 

A major concern with pet stores and the reason why puppies and kittens may not be sold in certain stores anymore is largely due to puppy mills. Puppy mills are commercial dog breeding businesses that breed dogs primarily for profit, often with little regard for animal welfare. According to the Puppy Mill Project "more than 2.5 million puppies are born in puppy mills each year" in the United States. Kitten mills are not as widely known as puppy mills, but they still do exist. The animals in these mills are kept in tiny, unsanitary cages, receive little to no nourishment, and often receive no veterinary care. Some cities in Canada, such as Toronto, have altogether banned the sale of cats and dogs in pet stores in order to put an end to this animal abuse.

In Canada and the U.S., another area of concern regarding pet stores are the laws that guide pet stores. In the U.S., there are no federal laws in place that protect animals in retail pet stores. There are state laws to protect animals; however they vary widely and may be insufficient. In twenty states and Washington, D.C., a license is required before being able to manage a pet store. The welfare of animals in pet shops relies heavily on the veterinary care available to them. In the United States, there are only 16 states that enforce veterinary care laws in pet stores.  In Ontario, Canada the Provincial Animal Welfare Act states that the Ontario Society for the Prevention of Cruelty to Animals has the authorization to examine places where animals are kept for sale, including pet shops.

In some states and cities in the United States - such as California and Atlanta - the sale of common pets such as dogs, cats, and rabbits, is prohibited except for those from animal shelters, in an attempt to curb poor standards of animal breeding.

United Kingdom 
In 1987 the British pet store trade had an estimated worth of £150 million. The largest pet store chain is Pets at Home.

In the United Kingdom, pet stores will be prohibited from selling puppies and kittens less than six months old. The ban was announced in 2018 following public pressure to improve animal breeding standards.

See also
 Cat food
 Dog food
 Dog grooming
 Leroy Milton Grider

References

Animal welfare
Dog shows and showing
Animal hair
Dog equipment
Articles containing video clips
 
Retailers by type of merchandise sold
Cats as pets
Pet foods
Dog nutrition